The 2000 Czech Figure Skating Championships were held in Mladá Boleslav between January 13 and 16, 2000. Skaters competed in the disciplines of men's singles, ladies' singles, pair skating, and ice dancing on the senior and junior levels.

Senior results

Men

Ladies

Pairs

Ice dancing

External links
 results

Czech Figure Skating Championships, 2000
Czech Figure Skating Championships
2000 in Czech sport